The Nashville Stars were a semi-pro Negro league baseball team in the late 1930s through the early 1950s. The Stars played in the major league Negro Major League in 1942 and the Negro Southern League in 1951. They were located in Nashville, Tennessee, and played their home games at Sulphur Dell. Nashville newspapers from the era indicate the team held membership in the Negro Southern League in 1950 as well.

Revival
In 2019, an investment group, Music City Baseball LLC, announced plans to secure a possible Major League Baseball expansion franchise or lure an existing team to Nashville that would be called the Nashville Stars in honor of the city's Negro league teams.

References 

Negro league baseball teams
Baseball teams established in 1942
Baseball teams disestablished in 1942
Sports in Nashville, Tennessee
Professional baseball teams in Tennessee
1942 establishments in Tennessee
1942 disestablishments in Tennessee
Defunct baseball teams in Tennessee